The Orpheus Musical Theatre Society is an amateur musical theatre society, based in Ottawa, Ontario, which was founded in 1906.

Orpheus performs three shows annually at the Centrepointe Theatre in Ottawa, Ontario.

References

External links 
 The Orpheus Web site

Theatrical organizations in Canada
Theatre companies in Ontario
Theatre in Ottawa